First Lady of Mexico, also known as First Lady of the United Mexican States, is the unofficial title of the wife of the president of Mexico. Beatriz Gutiérrez Müller is the wife of current president Andrés Manuel López Obrador.

María Flores de Lascuráin, spouse of Pedro Lascuráin, was Mexico's and the world's briefest ever first lady, since her husband served as president for less than an hour.

Role of the first lady
The first lady is not an elected position, carries no official duties and brings no salary. Nonetheless, she attends many official ceremonies and functions of state either along with or in place of the president. There is a strict taboo against the first lady holding outside employment while occupying the office. Usually the first lady takes an important (ceremonial) post as head of the Desarrollo Integral de la Familia (DIF) ("Integral Family Development"). However, this did not occur during the Fox administration when First Lady Marta Sahagún founded the national philanthropic organization Vamos México.

Two first ladies have been active politicians: Martha Sahagún, who married Vicente Fox during his tenure (2001–2006), had been a party activist and candidate for Mayor of Celaya on the PAN party ticket, and was briefly considered a contender for PAN's nomination to run for either the Jefe de Gobierno (Governor of the Federal District) or President in the 2006 election. Margarita Zavala, wife of Felipe Calderón, was a deputy from 2003 to 2006. In the 2018 Mexican general election, she was a pre-candidate for the nomination of PAN, and then she briefly ran as an independent.

Beatriz Gutiérrez Müller, wife of Andrés Manuel López Obrador, abolished the post stating it was a "role with no concrete functions or responsibilities. She also said she wanted to "serve Mexico any way she can", and that the title "First Lady" is "somewhat classist". 
She claimed there are not and should not be first nor second class women.

First ladies of Mexico 
Revolutionary era

Post-revolutionary era

Living first ladies

The most recent first lady to die was Paloma Cordero de de la Madrid on May 11, 2020.

See also

 List of heads of state of Mexico
 List of Mexican imperial consorts
 Politics of Mexico

References

Notes

External links

 
First Lady
Mexico
First Lady